Folta is a surname. Notable people with this surname include: 
Carl Folta, executive vice president of corporate communications for Viacom
Kevin Folta, chairman of the horticultural sciences department at the University of Florida
Milan Folta, Slovak former handball player